Mohsen Mostafavi (born 1954 in Isfahan) is an Iranian-American architect and educator. Mostafavi is currently the Alexander and Victoria Wiley Professor of Design at the Harvard Graduate School of Design. From 2008 through 2019, Mostafavi served as the school's dean.

Career
Mostafavi received a Bachelor of Architecture from the Architectural Association School of Architecture in 1976. He would later teach at Cambridge University, the Städelschule, the University of Pennsylvania, and Harvard University.

On January 1, 2008, Mostafavi was named Dean and Alexander and Victoria Wiley Professor of Design at the Harvard University Graduate School of Design. He had previously been the Gale and Ira Drukier Dean and Arthur L. and Isabel B. Wiesenberger Professor in Architecture at the Cornell University College of Architecture, Art, and Planning.

Mostafavi also serves on the steering committee of the Aga Khan Award for Architecture. He has served on the design committee of the London Development Agency and the Royal Gold Medal. Mostafavi was the head of the LafargeHolcim Awards for Sustainable Construction for Europe in 2005, for the global jury in 2006, and for North America in 2008.

Works
On Weathering: The Life of Buildings in Time, with David Leatherbarrow, 1993, 
Manuel Brullet, with Josep Quetglas, 1998, 
Approximations: The Architecture of Peter Märkli, 2002, 
Surface Architecture, 2002, 
Landscape Urbanism: A Manual for the Machinic Landscape, 2003, 
Implicate and Explicate: Aga Khan Award for Architecture, 2011, 
Nicholas Hawksmoor: London Churches, with Hélène Binet, 2013, 
Ecological Urbanism, with Gareth Doherty, 2015, 
Urbanismo ecológico en América Latina, with Gareth Doherty, Marina Correia, Ana Maria Duran Calisto, and Giannina Braschi, 2019, .
 IJP The Book of Surfaces forward for the book by George L. Legendre, 2003,

Personal life
Mostafavi is married to Homa Farjadi, who is currently principal of Farjadi Architects and Professor of Practice at the University of Pennsylvania School of Design.

References

External links
 Harvard profile

1954 births
Living people
People from Isfahan
American people of Iranian descent
Iranian expatriate academics
Iranian architects
Architectural theoreticians
Alumni of the Architectural Association School of Architecture
University of Pennsylvania faculty
Cornell University faculty
Harvard Graduate School of Design faculty